Gaz Deraz (also Romanized as Gaz Derāz and Gez Derāz; also known as Gazeh Darāz and Gāzeh Derāz) is a village in Cheghapur Rural District, Kaki District, Dashti County, Bushehr Province, Iran. At the 2006 census, its population was 142, in 34 families.

References 

Populated places in Dashti County